Alawa may refer to:
 Alawa people, an ethnic group of Australia
 Alawa language, an Australian language
 Alawa language (Tanzania), a Cushitic language of Tanzania
 Alawa, Northern Territory, a suburb of Darwin, Australia
 Nadia Alawa, charity founder

See also 
 Alava (disambiguation)

Language and nationality disambiguation pages